Bruno Barbosa dos Santos (born 31 August 1979), better known as Bruno Santos, is a Brazilian male supermodel, environmental activist and international businessman.

A model in a photo and fashion shows, Bruno gained notoriety in the mid-2000s, when he appeared in advertising campaigns and fashion events for the most famous brands in the world, such as Guess, Versace, GQ, Giorgio Armani, among others, promoting several segments for them, from underwear, fashion shows, eyewear, events, to fragrances, becoming the male image with the greatest exposure in the world. In 2002, he was ranked among the 10 most sought-after male models in the fashion world, and is considered one of the most respected models in the world by models.com. Not for nothing, he earned the nickname "Gisele Bündchen in pants".

One of the world most known Top Models, Bruno also became notorious for being the only male model selected to carry out two campaigns simultaneously for two competing fashion houses: Versace and Giorgio Armani, in addition to, in 2003, having opened the Ricardo Almeida stylist's show at São Paulo Fashion Week in which, at the time, he obtained the highest male pay check in the event's history.

Biography 
From a humble family (son of a self-employed trader with a public-school teacher, and having 4 more brothers, 1 of whom is a woman), Bruno studied at a public school. In an interview for Fábio Bernardo magazine, Bruno said that "one of the reasons that led me not to miss a day of class was school lunch or breakfast, served at school after the second hour".

Upon finishing high school, Bruno passed the selection process at the Centro Federal de Educação Tecnológica (Cefet), in Minas Gerais state, to take the technical course in Engineering.

To help with the family's income, he worked as a popsicle salesman and as an office boy, did odd jobs in construction, schools, restaurants, did graphic services, and also worked in a storeroom and as a math teacher.

Career 
Bruno started his modelling career by chance in the year 2000. He received a proposal, but did not give much importance. The agent then made a new proposal, which turned out to be quite advantageous. In an interview for a newspaper from the Uberaba city called "Jornal Cidade", Bruno said that he accepted the proposal not for the work itself, but for the opportunity to learn another language and get to know a new culture, as the expenses would all be paid for by the agency.

From 2002 to 2005, he had an intense schedule, parading in the most famous fashion events in the world, becoming the male image with the most exposure in the world.

At the end of 2005 until mid-2006, Bruno took a break from his work as a model to dedicate himself to personal and family projects, doing only occasional work.

From the 2010s onwards, Bruno started to accept only occasional jobs.

Fashion events parades 
In 2002, during that year's Milan Fashion Week, he opened and closed the shows for both Versace and Giorgio Armani. It was the first time a male model had run campaigns simultaneously for two competing fashion houses. At this event he also paraded for Iceberg.

In 2003, he modelled at São Paulo Fashion Week, opening the fashion show by stylist Ricardo Almeida, alongside Rodrigo Santoro and receiving the highest male fee in the event's history, in addition to closing the ZOOMP fashion show, alongside by supermodel Gisele Bündchen.

Also, in 2003, he modelled for Armani at Milan Fashion Week.

In 2004, at Paris Fashion Week, he modelled for designer John Galliano.

Also, in 2004, he modelled for Armani] at Milan Fashion Week.

Also, in 2004, he modelled again for Armani, this time during New York Fashion Week.

In 2005, during Milan Fashion Week, he walked the runway for Armani.

Also, in 2005, at New York Fashion Week, he modelled for Versace.

In 2006, he modelled at New York Fashion Week at Versace's fall show.

In 2008, he modelled at New York Fashion Week at Nautica's Fall Show and Harmonte & Blaine's Spring Show.

In 2012, he modelled at Milan Fashion Week in the fall show for Ermanno Scervino.

Photos in advertising campaigns

Magazines on the cover

Interviews/Reports in Printed Newspapers and/or Magazines

Participation in TV shows

Environmental activism and encouragement of ecotourism 

After reducing his schedule to fashion events, in the mid-2010s, Bruno started to dedicate a little more of his time to environmental causes. One of his first projects was to financially help the Associação dos Amigos dos Lajedos do Cariri Paraibano, which, among other things, gives lectures and classes in the region on ecotourism and environmental education.

In the microregion of Cariri Paraibano, Bruno defends the cause against the desertification that is taking place in the surroundings of Lajedo de Pai Mateus. Because of this, in this region, Bruno has a personal project of reforestation by the sea of several native trees with the objective of recovering degraded soil.

To encourage ecotourism in that region, Bruno carried out a fashion photography project at the famous Lajedo de Pai Mateus. Soon after this initiative, some companies, such as Cavalera, for example, started taking photos of their campaigns in this same location.

References

External links 
 

Living people
1979 births
Brazilian male models